Woodland is a town in Randolph County, Alabama, United States. At the 2010 census the population was 184, down from 192 in 2000. It incorporated in 1967.

Geography
Woodland is located at  (33.373655, -85.395700).

The town is located along Alabama State Route 48 northeast of the Randolph County seat of Wedowee. AL-48 leads northeast 10 mi (16 km) to its end at the Alabama-Georgia state line, and southwest 9 mi (14 km) to Wedowee.

Demographics

As of the census of 2000, there were 192 people, 82 households, and 56 families residing in the town. The racial makeup of the town was 88.54% White and 11.46% Black or African American.

There were 82 households, out of which 36.6% had children under the age of 18 living with them, 51.2% were married couples living together, 17.1% had a female householder with no husband present, and 30.5% were non-families. 30.5% of all households were made up of individuals, and 12.2% had someone living alone who was 65 years of age or older. The average household size was 2.34 and the average family size was 2.89.

The median income for a household in the town was $31,500, and the median income for a family was $41,250. Males had a median income of $43,750 versus $24,375 for females. The per capita income for the town was $17,106. About 15.2% of families and 14.9% of the population were below the poverty line, including 22.7% of those under the age of 18 and 5.4% of those 65 or over.

Climate
Month        Avg. High  	Avg. Low  	Avg. Precip.  	Rec. High  	Rec. Low

January  	55 °F  	         30 °F  	5.91 in  	 83°     	 61 °F

February  	59 °F  	         32 °F  	5.11 in  	 82°    	 72 °F

March    	68 °F  	         39 °F  	6.05 in  	 87°     	86 °F

April  	        77 °F      	 45 °F  	4.42 in  	 92°     	96 °F

May  	        83 °F  	         54 °F  	3.65 in  	 98°     	100 °F

June  	        90 °F  	         62 °F  	4.21 in  	103°    	107 °F

July  	        92 °F  	         67 °F  	4.64 in  	107°     	112 °F

August  	91 °F  	         65 °F  	3.63 in  	104°     	115 °F

September  	86 °F  	         59 °F  	3.69 in  	100°     	102 °F

October  	77 °F  	         46 °F  	2.69 in  	 99°     	93 °F

November  	67 °F  	         38 °F  	4.60 in  	 86°     	 87 °F

December  	58 °F  	         32 °F  	4.68 in  	 80°     	80 °F

Notable persons
Vern Gosdin - country and gospel singer
 Wes Bayliss - lead singer for The Steel Woods
 Danny Mote - Rockabilly Hall of Fame, Vee Jay Records Singer/Songwriter

Photo gallery

References

Towns in Randolph County, Alabama
Towns in Alabama
Populated places established in 1965